Withrow is a hamlet in central Alberta, Canada within Clearwater County.

Demographics 
Withrow recorded a population of 50 in the 1991 Census of Population conducted by Statistics Canada.

See also 
List of communities in Alberta
List of hamlets in Alberta

References 

Clearwater County, Alberta
Hamlets in Alberta